is a park in  Shibuya, Tokyo, Japan. It is located adjacent to Harajuku Station and Meiji Shrine in Yoyogikamizonochō. The park is a popular Tokyo destination, especially on Sundays when it is  used as a gathering place for Japanese rock music fans, jugglers, comedians, martial arts clubs, cosplayers and other subculture and hobby groups. In spring, thousands of people visit the park to enjoy the cherry blossom during hanami. The landscaped park has picnic areas, bike paths, cycle rentals, public sport courts, and a dog run.

Etymology

The word yoyogi (代々木) literally means "generation after generation of trees".

History 

Yoyogi Park stands on the site from where the first successful powered aircraft flight in Japan took place by Captain Yoshitoshi Tokugawa on 19 December 1910. The area later became an army parade ground. From September 1945, the site housed the military barracks known as the "Washington Heights" for U.S. officers during the Allied occupation of Japan.

The area was used for the 1964 Summer Olympics housing the main Olympic village and the Yoyogi National Gymnasium. The distinctive building, which was designed by Kenzo Tange, hosted swimming and diving, with an annex for basketball.

In 1967 most of the area north of the gymnasium complex and south of Meiji Shrine was absorbed by Yoyogi Park.

Tokyo's failed bid to host the 2016 Summer Olympics included a proposal to redevelop Yoyogi Park. A new volleyball arena was to be built west of the Yoyogi National Gymnasium. It would have replaced a small stadium with a football and athletics arena.  In Tokyo's 2020 Summer Olympics bid, Yoyogi National Gymnasium is the proposed venue for handball events.

2014 dengue fever cases
In 2014, Tokyo experienced one of its worst dengue fever outbreaks in 100 years and the first recorded cases in 70 years, with nearly 200 confirmed cases. The first case was reported on August 27, 2014. Using gene sequencing techniques, scientists determined that the outbreak originated in Yoyogi Park. Dozens of visitors to the area contracted the disease, leading to the park's closure on September 4. No further cases were discovered after September 18, and the park re-opened to the public on October 31.

References

External links
 
 Tokyo Metropolitan Parks Guide, Yoyogi Information

Parks and gardens in Tokyo
Urban public parks in Japan
Shibuya
Olympic Parks